Ireton is a surname. Notable people with the surname include:

Albert Ireton (1879–1947), British athlete
Bridget Ireton (1650-1726), daughter of Henry Ireton
Catherine Ireton, Irish pop singer and member of God Help the Girl and The Go Away Birds
John Ireton (1615–1689), English politician
Henry Ireton (1611–1651), English general associated with the English Civil War
Henry Ireton (died 1711), English army officer and politician 
Peter Leo Ireton, an American Catholic bishop